The 1975 Tipperary Senior Hurling Championship was the 85th staging of the Tipperary Senior Hurling Championship since its establishment by the Tipperary County Board in 1887.

Thurles Sarsfields were the defending champions.

Moneygall won the championship after a 3-13 to 0-05 defeat of Kilruane MacDonaghs in a final replay at Semple Stadium. It was their first ever championship title.

References

Tipperary
Tipperary Senior Hurling Championship